Czech Film Critics' Award for Best Director is one of the awards given to the best Czech motion picture.

Winners

References

External links

Awards for best director
Czech Film Critics' Awards
Awards established in 2010